The 2015 Nicky Rackard Cup (tier 3) was the eleventh staging of the Nicky Rackard Cup hurling championship since its establishment by the Gaelic Athletic Association in 2005. The cup competition began on 2 May 2015 and culminated on 13 June 2015. The bottom two teams will play off with the loser playing the winner of the 2015 Lory Meagher Cup (tier 4).

Tyrone were the defending champions and they participated in the competition again after opting not to face Down in the 2014 Christy Ring Cup relegation promotion playoff.

Longford entered the 2015 competition after defeating Sligo in 2014 Nicky Rackard Cup Promotion/relegation playoff.

Roscommon won the title after defeating Armagh by 2-12 to 1-14 in the final.

Structure
Eight teams play in Round 1. 
The Round 1 winners advance to Round 2A. The Round 1 losers go into Round 2B.
The Round 2A winners advance to the semi-finals. The Round 2A losers go into the quarter-finals.
The Round 2B winners advance to the quarter-finals. The Round 2B losers go into the relegation playoff.
The quarter-final winners advance to the semi-final.
The semi-final winners advance to the final.
The final winners receive the Nicky Rackard Cup (tier 3) and play the losers of the Christy Ring Cup (tier 2) relegation playoff for the right to play in the 2016 Christy Ring Cup.
The Round 2B losers play a relegation playoff. The losing team plays the winner of the Lory Meagher Cup (tier 4) with the winner playing in the 2016 Nicky Rackard Cup and the losing team playing in the 2016 Lory Meagher Cup.

Round 1

Winners progress to Round 2A. Losers go to Round 2B.

Round 2A

Winners progress to the semi-finals. Losers go into the quarter-finals.

Round 2B

Winners go into the quarter-finals. Losers go into the Relegation Playoff

Quarter-finals

Semi-finals

Final

Relegation play-off

External links
GAA Fixtures 2015 

Nicky Rackard Cup
Nicky Rackard Cup